Lorna Crozier, OC (born 24 May 1948) is a Canadian poet who holds the Head Chair in the Writing Department at the University of Victoria. She has authored fifteen books and was named an Officer of the Order of Canada in 2011. She is credited as Lorna Uher on some of her earlier books.

Life
Crozier was born in Swift Current, Saskatchewan in 1948.

Crozier attended the University of Saskatchewan where she received her B.A. in 1969, and the University of Alberta where she received her M.A. in 1980. Before publishing her poems and stories, Crozier was a high school English teacher and guidance counsellor. During these years, her first poem was published in Grain magazine. She also taught creative writing at the Banff School of Fine Arts, the Saskatchewan Summer School of the Arts, and the Sechelt Summer Writing Festival. Crozier has served as the writer-in-residence at the Cypress Hills Community College in 1983, the Regina Public Library, and the University of Toronto in 1989.

Crozier has authored fifteen books of work, which typically focus on human relationships, the natural world, language, memory, and perception. Alongside partner Patrick Lane, Crozier has co-authored No Longer Two People (1979), and co-edited Breathing Fire: Canada's New Poets (1995) and Breathing Fire 2 (2004).
 
A book review from The Globe and Mail by Jacqueline Baker on Crozier's book, Small Beneath the Sky: A Prairie Memoir, emphasized Crozier's prairie roots, and gave positive feedback on this memoir. In an interview with Joseph Planta of THECOMMENTARY.ca regarding the same book, she reveals the alcohol and poverty that surrounded her as a child. Although she grew up with a fairly difficult childhood, Crozier took her past and turned it into well renowned poetry.

She has received a 1992 Governor General's Award, the Canadian Authors Association Award for Poetry, the National Magazine Award (Gold Medal), and first prize in the National CBC Literary Competition. Crozier received the University of Victoria's Distinguished Professors Award and the University of Regina presented her with an honorary Doctorate of Law in 2004. Crozier has given various benefit readings for organizations such as the Society for the Prevention of Cruelty to Animals, Wintergreen Studios, The Land Conservancy of British Columbia, the Victoria READ Society, and PEERS, a group devoted to getting prostitutes off the streets. She has read her poetry on every continent other than Antarctica, and on 19 May 2005 Crozier recited a poem for Queen Elizabeth II as part of Saskatchewan's Centennial Celebration.

In 2009 she was made a Fellow of the Royal Society of Canada and in 2011 Crozier became an Officer of the Order of Canada.

Her memoir Through the Garden: A Love Story (with Cats) was shortlisted for the 2020 Hilary Weston Writers' Trust Prize for Nonfiction.

Poetry
Inside Is the Sky – 1976 (as Lorna Uher)
Crow's Black Joy – 1979 (as Lorna Uher)
Humans and Other Beasts – 1980 (as Lorna Uher)
No Longer Two People: A Series of Poems (with Patrick Lane) – 1981
The Weather – 1983
The Garden Going on Without Us – 1985 (nominated for a Governor General's Award)
Angels of Flesh, Angels of Silence – 1988 (nominated for a Governor General's Award)
Inventing the Hawk – 1992 (winner of the Governor General's Award for Poetry and the Pat Lowther Award)
Everything Arrives at the Light – 1995 (winner of the Pat Lowther Award)
A Saving Grace: Collected Poems – 1996
What the Living Won't Let Go – 1999
Apocrypha of Light – 2002
Bones in Their Wings: Ghazals – 2003
Whetstone – 2005
Before the First Word: The Poetry of Lorna Crozier (selected by Catherine Hunter) – 2005
The Blue Hour of the Day: Selected Poems – 2007
Small Mechanics – 2011 (nominated for the Pat Lowther Award)
The Wrong Cat – 2015 (winner of the Pat Lowther Award)
The Wild in You: Voices from the Forest and the Sea (with photographs by Ian McAllister) – 2015
What the Soul Doesn't Want – 2017
God of Shadows – 2018
The House the Spirit Builds (with photographs by Peter Coffman and Diane Laundy) – 2019

Anthologies
A Sudden Radiance (with Gary Hyland) – 1987
Breathing Fire (with Patrick Lane) – 1995
Desire in Seven Voices – 2000
Addicted: Notes from the Belly of the Beast (with Patrick Lane) – 2001
Breathing Fire 2 (with Patrick Lane) – 2004
The Best Canadian Poetry in English 2010 – 2010

Non-fiction
Small Beneath the Sky – 2009
The Book of Marvels: A Compendium of Everyday Things – 2012 (nominated for the Pat Lowther Award)
Through the Garden: A Love Story (with Cats) – 2020

References

1948 births
Living people
20th-century Canadian poets
21st-century Canadian poets
University of Saskatchewan alumni
Governor General's Award-winning poets
Academic staff of the University of Victoria
People from Swift Current
Canadian women poets
Canadian non-fiction writers
20th-century Canadian women writers
21st-century Canadian women writers
Fellows of the Royal Society of Canada
Canadian women non-fiction writers
Officers of the Order of Canada